The 13th Pan American Games were held in Winnipeg, Manitoba, Canada from July 23 to August 8, 1999.

Medals

Bronze

Women's Football

See also
Costa Rica at the 2000 Summer Olympics

Nations at the 1999 Pan American Games
P
Costa Rica at the Pan American Games